Soltanabad (also Romanized as Solṭānābād) is a village in Esmaili Rural District, Esmaili District, Anbarabad County, Kerman Province, Iran. At the 2006 census, its population was 48, in 9 families.

References 

Populated places in Anbarabad County